The Culture of Narcissism: American Life in an Age of Diminishing Expectations is a 1979 book by the cultural historian Christopher Lasch, in which the author explores the roots and ramifications of what he perceives as the normalizing of pathological narcissism in 20th-century American culture using psychological, cultural, artistic and historical synthesis. For the mass-market edition published in September of the same year, Lasch won the 1980 US National Book Award in the category Current Interest (paperback).

Summary
Lasch proposes that since World War II, America has produced a personality-type consistent with clinical definitions of "pathological narcissism". This pathology is not akin to everyday narcissism, a hedonistic egoism, but with clinical diagnosis of narcissistic personality disorder. For Lasch, "pathology represents a heightened version of normality." He locates symptoms of this personality disorder in the radical political movements of the 1960s (such as the Weather Underground), as well as in the spiritual cults and movements of the 1970s, from est to Rolfing.

Reaction

An early response to The Culture of Narcissism commented that Lasch had identified the outcomes in American society of the decline of the family over the previous century. The book quickly became a bestseller and a talking point, being further propelled to success after Lasch notably visited Camp David to advise President Jimmy Carter for his "crisis of confidence" speech of 15 July 1979. Later editions include a new afterword, "The Culture of Narcissism Revisited".

Author Louis Menand argues that the book has been commonly misused by liberals and conservatives alike, who cited it for their own ideological agendas. Menand wrote: Lasch was not saying that things were better in the 1950s, as conservatives offended by countercultural permissiveness probably took him to be saying.  He was not saying that things were better in the 1960s, as former activists disgusted by the 'me-ism' of the seventies are likely to have imagined.  He was diagnosing a condition that he believed had originated in the nineteenth century. Lasch attempted to correct many of these misapprehensions with The Minimal Self in 1984.

Anthony Elliott writes that The Culture of Narcissism and The Minimal Self are Lasch's two best-known books.

Some editions 

 New York: Norton, 1979. 
 New York: Warner Books, 1980. 
 New York: Norton; Revised edition (May 1991).

See also

Notes

References

Menand, Louis.  "American Studies."  Farrar, Straus & Giroux: New York,  2002.

1979 non-fiction books
American non-fiction books
Books about the United States
Books by Christopher Lasch
English-language books
National Book Award-winning works
Sociology books
Works about narcissism
W. W. Norton & Company books